Mauritius Telecom Tower is a skyscraper in Port Louis, Mauritius. The 19 story building is currently the second tallest building in Mauritius and houses the headquarters of Mauritius Telecom. It has a height of 88 m but is 101 m tall when measured to its two lightning rods.

See also
Skyscraper design and construction
List of tallest buildings in Africa

References

Skyscraper office buildings in Mauritius
Buildings and structures in Port Louis